is a Japanese manga series written and illustrated by Kouta Hirano. The manga started serialization in Shōnen Gahosha's magazine Young King Ours in April 2009. It focuses on various historical figures summoned to an unknown world where their skills and techniques are needed by magicians in order to save their world from total destruction. An anime television series adaptation aired between October and December 2016; three additional original video animation (OVA) episodes were released from December 2017 to November 2018.

Synopsis

Shimazu Toyohisa, while involved at the Battle of Sekigahara, manages to mortally wound Ii Naomasa, but is critically injured in the process. As he walks from the field wounded and bleeding, Toyohisa finds himself transported to a corridor of doors, where a bespectacled man at a desk waits for him. This man, Murasaki, sends Toyohisa through the nearest door where he wakes up in another world. There, Toyohisa meets other great warriors like him who have been transported as well, to be part of a group known as "Drifters".

This world contains both native humans and a number of fantastical races, including elves, dwarves, and hobbits. However, the world is at war, with the humans waging a losing conflict against another group of great warriors, the "Ends", who wish to take over the world and kill all of the Drifters. Under the Ends' command are many horrible creatures, including giants and dragons, which they use to destroy everything in their path. At the start of the series, the Ends' army has control of the northern part of the continent, and are trying to invade the south through a pivotal fortress at the northernmost tip of a nation called Carneades. Meanwhile, the "Octobrist Organization", a group of human magicians native to this world, attempts to bring together the many individual Drifters to save their world from the brutal Ends.

Media

Manga
Written and illustrated by Kouta Hirano, Drifters debuted in Shōnen Gahosha's seinen manga magazine Young King Ours on April 30, 2009. It is licensed in North America by Dark Horse Comics, in France by Éditions Tonkam, in Germany by Panini Comics, in Italy by J-Pop, in Taiwan by Tong Li Comics and in Poland by Japonica Polonica Fantastica.

Volume list

Chapters not yet in tankōbon format

Anime
A 150-second anime adaptation of Drifters was packaged with the final volume of the Hellsing Ultimate video series in December 2012. The short, produced under the supervision of Ryoji Nakamori, technical director Kazuya Miura, and animation director Masayori Komine, featured the voices of Yūichi Nakamura as Shimazu Toyohisa and Mitsuru Miyamoto as Murasaki, with music composed by Yasushi Ishii.

In the May 2015 issue of Young King OURs, it was announced that a Drifters anime adaptation was in the works. A production site for the anime has been released. The anime was directed by Kenichi Suzuki, produced by NBCUniversal Entertainment Japan, animated by Hoods Drifters Studio, written by Hideyuki Kurata and Yōsuke Kuroda, featuring character designs by Ryoji Nakamori. Yasushi Ishii and Hayato Matsuo composed the music together. The opening theme, "Gospel Of The Throttle 狂奔REMIX ver.", is performed by Minutes til Midnight, while the ending theme, "Vermillion", is performed by Maon Kurosaki.

The 12-episode series began airing on October 7, 2016, on Tokyo MX. A specially edited version of the first and second episodes with a runtime of 36 minutes was bundled with the manga's fifth volume, and released on June 6, 2016. A special limited-pressing Blu-ray box set was released on December 30, 2016. The box set includes all twelve episodes (with added unaired footage), an exclusive box illustrated by Hirano, a 200-page animation sketch collection by chief animation director Ryoji Nakamori, a 52-page booklet, a bonus extras disc, and a two-CD original soundtrack. The bonus extras disc contained an omake titled "", promotional videos, and other materials. Customers who pre-ordered the box set from participating retailers before November 6, 2016, would receive an exclusive illustration card set. Additionally, the box set included a form for advance ticket sales for an event that was held on April 2, 2017, at Maihama Amphitheater in Chiba.

In Japan, the anime is exclusively streamed on the AbemaTV service simultaneously as the anime aired on Japanese television, starting on October 7 at 11p.m. The series has been licensed by Funimation for streaming in English-speaking countries and home video and on-demand distribution for the U.S. Additionally, Funimation streamed Drifters in English beginning on November 6, 2016, at 10:00 p.m. ET. As part of Funimation's partnership with Crunchyroll, Crunchyroll also streamed Drifters as it aired in Japan. Drifters was also broadcast on Aniplus Asia. Funimation released a DVD/Blu-ray combo package for Drifters on October 3, 2017. Universal Pictures UK acquired the series for the United Kingdom and Ireland, and released it on October 8, 2018. Universal Sony classified the series for release in Australia and New Zealand, and released it on October 17, 2018.

At the end of the anime's twelfth episode, a second season was announced with the message "See You Again, Tokyo 20XX". On October 10, 2017, it was announced the thirteenth and fourteenth episodes, the first two episodes of the second season were released on December 23, 2017, on Blu-ray discs in regular and limited-edition versions. The limited edition includes an outer case illustrated by manga creator Kouta Hirano, a jacket illustrated by character designer and chief animation director Ryoji Nakamori, a bonus video, a drama CD, a 72-page booklet, and a "mystery disc." A fifteenth episode was released on DVD with the manga's 6th volume special edition on November 30, 2018.

Reception
The manga has sold over 1.5 million copies worldwide in five different languages. Drifters  has been nominated twice for the annual Manga Taishō Awards, once in the year 2011 and again in the year 2012. The manga was also received well by BAMFAS, saying that the "action paces itself throughout the volume, making sure to include only enough to keep readers moving quickly through the event until the next transition hits." Writers for Crunchyroll note that "Drifters has all but jumped the shark by belligerently knocking over all the narrative pillars of the genre." The Inquisitr agrees with this assessment, writing that "anime fans have been treated to a steady stream of the Isekai subgenre…but Drifters pretty much turns our expectations on its head."

In a survey by the Japanese website Anime Anime!, Drifters won fifth place among top 10 manga properties to have an animated adaptation.

See also
 Riverworld, a book series with a similar concept.
 Warriors Orochi, a video game spin-off of Dynasty Warriors with a similar concept.

Explanatory notes

References

External links
  
 Drifters on Dark Horse Comics website 
 Funimation website for Drifters
 

2009 manga
Adventure anime and manga
Anime OVAs
Cultural depictions of Adolf Hitler
Cultural depictions of Grand Duchess Anastasia Nikolaevna of Russia
Cultural depictions of Butch Cassidy and the Sundance Kid
Cultural depictions of Gilles de Rais
Cultural depictions of Grigori Rasputin
Cultural depictions of Hannibal
Cultural depictions of Joan of Arc
Cultural depictions of Oda Nobunaga
Cultural depictions of Scipio Africanus
Dark fantasy anime and manga
Dark Horse Comics titles
Funimation
Hoods Entertainment
Isekai anime and manga
NBCUniversal Entertainment Japan
Seinen manga
Shōnen Gahōsha manga
Television shows written by Yōsuke Kuroda
Tokyo MX original programming